Tympanic may mean:
Tympanic nerve
Tympanic bone
Tympanic muscle

See also
Tympanum (disambiguation)